Diary is the debut studio album by American rock band Sunny Day Real Estate. The album is considered by many to be a defining emo album of the second wave, and also key in the development of its subgenre, Midwest emo. It has also been called the missing link between post-hardcore and the nascent emo genre.

Diary was remastered and reissued in 2009, with bonus tracks "8" and "9" from their 1993 7-inch Thief, Steal Me a Peach and newly written liner notes.

Overview
The songlist started with six tracks written by Thief, Steal Me a Peach, a project started when bassist Nate Mendel went on tour with his other project Christ on a Crutch, and drummer William Goldsmith invited his friend Jeremy Enigk to jam with him and guitarist and then singer Dan Hoerner. The first songs afterwards had titles regarding their order in composing - "Seven", "8" and "9", though only the first appeared on Diary. The band had a tradition of numbering songs for title long before Jeremy's arrival. The songs "47" and "48" were actually the two first songs written since his arrival before resetting the song's numbers. The album was notably released on the exact same day that Weezer's self-titled album (blue album) was released; May 10, 1994.

The album was released on CD, vinyl and cassette. The vinyl has been released in three limited edition pressings, all of which are out of print. The first was a multi-colored splatter vinyl, released on "Glitterhouse Records" in Germany. The second was a black vinyl pressing on Sub Pop. A repress followed on green vinyl (and possibly a second black pressing), but the label for this second pressing states "Edition II" under the Sub Pop logo. All three vinyl pressings are missing 3 songs that are present on the CD, possibly due to the time constraints of vinyl, as the album clocks in at 53 minutes. The missing songs are "Round", "48" and "Grendel". The 2009 double LP re-issue contains all 11 songs from the original album, and two bonus tracks.

The artwork of the album was almost entirely done by Chris Thompson. However, the "butterfly" drawing on the album's booklet was created by Nate Mendel's father. The album cover features figures similar to those of popular children's toy Little People.

Legacy
The album was different from those released by popular Seattle grunge bands at the time. Its melodic but urgent sound has had a clear mark on future emo groups. Despite being the only album by the band to never chart, it has since become the seventh best-selling album released on Sub Pop, having sold more than 231,000 copies.  Rolling Stone writes, "Diary captures the vague inner-turmoil of Enigk's lyrics and propels those turbulent emotions to the heavens."

Diary was ranked amongst the best emo albums of all time in the Italian music magazine XL. It has appeared on various best-of emo album lists by Junkee, Kerrang!, LA Weekly, NME, and Rolling Stone, as well as by journalists Leslie Simon and Trevor Kelley in their book Everybody Hurts: An Essential Guide to Emo Culture (2007). The album was ranked at number 155 on Spins "The 300 Best Albums of the Past 30 Years (1985–2014)" list. Ian Cohen from Pitchfork writes, "it's the terse yet tender delivery of the lyrics from Jeremy Enigk that ultimately drew people in." "In Circles" and "Seven" appeared on a best-of emo songs list by Vulture.

The song "Seven" was featured in the South Park episode "Goth Kids 3: Dawn of the Posers", and it was performed by the band on an episode of The Jon Stewart Show. It is also featured in Guitar Hero 5, and it was also released on the Rock Band Network on July 5, 2010. YouTube comedian Jarrod Alonge covered "Seven" on his album Awkward & Depressed.

Track listing

Personnel
Sunny Day Real Estate
 Jeremy Enigk – lead vocals, rhythm guitar, keyboards
 Dan Hoerner – lead guitar, backing vocals
 Nate Mendel – bass guitar
 William Goldsmith – drums, percussion

Additional personnel
Brad Wood – producer, engineer, mixing
Lynn Hamrick – photography
Chris Thompson – artwork

References
Citations

Sources

External links

Diary at YouTube (streamed copy where licensed)
 "In Circles" music video

Sub Pop albums
Sunny Day Real Estate albums
1994 debut albums
Albums produced by Brad Wood